Dearne may refer to:

River Dearne, a river in South Yorkshire, England
Dearne Valley, an urban area in South Yorkshire, England; formerly known as Dearne Urban District